Homalinotus is a genus of weevils belonging to the family Curculionidae.

Species
 Homalinotus angulatus
 Homalinotus aragaoi
 Homalinotus bolivianus
 Homalinotus calcaratus
 Homalinotus circumdatus
 Homalinotus colosseus
 Homalinotus colossus
 Homalinotus complanatus
 Homalinotus compressus
 Homalinotus conspergatus
 Homalinotus coriaceus
 Homalinotus cyanicollis
 Homalinotus densatus
 Homalinotus deplanatus
 Homalinotus depressus
 Homalinotus distinctus
 Homalinotus fasciatus
 Homalinotus giganteus
 Homalinotus humeralis
 Homalinotus hystrix
 Homalinotus indus
 Homalinotus inermicrus
 Homalinotus jamaicensis
 Homalinotus lherminieri
 Homalinotus lugubris
 Homalinotus matogrossensis
 Homalinotus nodipennis
 Homalinotus perplexus
 Homalinotus platynotus
 Homalinotus porosus
 Homalinotus tristis
 Homalinotus umbilicatus
 Homalinotus validus

References 

 Catalogue of Life
 Wtaxa

Molytinae